Aidan Burley (born 22 January 1979) is a British politician. He was  Conservative Member of Parliament for Cannock Chase, elected in 2010 on a large vote swing away from the Labour Party candidate. Burley stepped down in 2015.

Early life
Burley was born in Auckland, New Zealand and migrated with his parents to the United Kingdom a few months later.

He was educated at West House School, Birmingham, King Edward's School, Birmingham, standing as a Conservative in 1997 in the school's mock election.

Career
Burley was a management consultant for Accenture and later Hedra/Mouchel, working on contracts with the Home Office and the National Health Service.

During this period, he also worked for Conservative MPs Philip Hammond and Nick Herbert when they were shadow ministers, and he was elected a Conservative councillor in 2006 for the Fulham Broadway ward of Hammersmith and Fulham London Borough Council.

Parliamentary career
Burley was elected to the House of Commons as Member of Parliament for Cannock Chase in the 2010 general election with a majority of 3,195.

Burley was a member of the Home Affairs Select Committee from 2010 to 2011. Between 12 January 2011 and 17 December 2011 he was Parliamentary Private Secretary (PPS) to the Secretary of State for Transport: firstly Philip Hammond, and later Justine Greening. He is a supporter of the Free Enterprise Group.

Burley was named by ConservativeHome as one of a minority of loyal Conservative backbench MPs not to have voted against the government in any significant rebellions.

In 2014, Burley, along with six other Conservative Party MPs, voted against the Equal Pay (Transparency) Bill, which would require all companies with more than 250 employees to declare the gap in pay between the average male and average female salaries.

Political funding
It was reported in 2014 that the Cannock Chase Conservative Association had received £28,927 since 2010, and that Burley had received corporate donations from Japan Tobacco International and JCB Research; he had also received a donation from Conservative Friends of Israel. He also received £3,600 in remunerations from Clever Together LLP for work he did in 2012.

Controversies

Nazi controversy

On 11 December 2011, it was reported that Burley had attended a stag party at the French ski resort of Val Thorens which involved Nazi uniforms and salutes, including a toast "to Tom for organising the stag do, and if we're perfectly honest, to the ideology and thought process of the Third Reich". Burley subsequently released a statement through the Conservative Campaign Headquarters, saying: "There was clearly inappropriate behaviour by some of the other guests and I deeply regret that this happened. I am extremely sorry for any offence that will undoubtedly have been caused." On 17 December 2011, the Prime Minister, David Cameron, sacked Burley from his role as PPS after new claims emerged linking him directly to "the offensive and foolish behaviour". On 22 December, French prosecuting authorities announced they had started a preliminary inquiry into the event. The groom was prosecuted in a French court for wearing the Nazi uniform, and was subsequently fined and ordered to pay a sum of money to a Holocaust charity; his French lawyer said it was "deeply unfair" that Burley, who had organised the stag party, had not also been prosecuted.

An internal Conservative party inquiry found that Burley had "caused deep offence". Whilst he was not a "racist or anti-Semite", Burley had not clearly shown his disapproval of the Nazi toast. The report accepted that he had not been present during any Nazi chanting. Claiming that Burley had already admitted bringing shame on the constituency, his fellow West Midlands MP, Labour's Ian Austin, said the report's findings should be rejected and he should be kicked out of the party. Burley announced on 5 February 2014 that he would not contest the 2015 general election.

Twitter controversy
During the opening ceremony of the 2012 Olympic Games, taking place in London, Burley denounced the content of the ceremony on Twitter as "...leftie multicultural crap. Bring back Red Arrows, Shakespeare and the Stones". He went on to suggest that it was "the most leftie opening ceremony I have ever seen – more than Beijing, the capital of a Communist state". Burley later attempted to clarify his remarks, tweeting: "Seems my tweet has been misunderstood. I was talking about the way it was handled in the show, not multiculturalism itself." Criticism both on Twitter and elsewhere followed the publication of the tweet. Fellow Conservative MP Gavin Barwell, who represented Croydon Central, expressed indignation, writing that "us Londoners are rather proud of the diversity of our city," and noting that there was "nothing left-wing about it." On 30 July, Prime Minister David Cameron commented that "what (Burley) said was completely wrong ... an idiotic thing to say". Burley later commented that "parts of [the opening ceremony] were overtly political, like showing [Campaign for Nuclear Disarmament] signs", and in reference to Dizzee Rascal's live performance of "Bonkers", Burley questioned why there was, in his view, a "huge, disproportionate focus on rap music when it is a small part of multiculturalism".

References

External links
Aidan Burley MP official website
Aidan Burley MP Conservative Party profile
Commons Hansard contributions 2010–11
Aidan Burley profile at New Statesman Your democracy

Official channel at YouTube

1979 births
Living people
Accenture people
Alumni of St John's College, Oxford
Conservative Party (UK) councillors
Conservative Party (UK) MPs for English constituencies
Councillors in the London Borough of Hammersmith and Fulham
New Zealand emigrants to the United Kingdom
People educated at King Edward's School, Birmingham
Politicians from Auckland
UK MPs 2010–2015
Free Enterprise Group